Luis Hernández may refer to:

Footballers
 Luis Hernández (footballer, born 1949), Cuban football administrator and former midfielder
 Luis Hernández (footballer, born 1959), Cuban football midfielder
 Luis Hernández (footballer, born 1968) , Mexican football striker
 Luis Daniel Hernández (born 1977), Peruvian football left-back
 Luis Hernández (footballer, born 1981), Peruvian football midfielder
 Luis Miguel Hernández (born 1985), Salvadoran football defender
 Luis Hernández (footballer, born 1989), Spanish football centre-back
 Luis Humberto Hernández (born 1992), Mexican football defender
 Luis Hernández Kerlegand (born 1993), Mexican football forward
 Luis Enrique Hernández (born 1996), Mexican football midfielder
 Luis Hernández (footballer, born 1998), Mexican football midfielder
 Luis Donaldo Hernández (born 1998), Mexican football defender
 Luis Hernández (Costa Rican footballer) (born 1998), Costa Rican football defender
Luis Hernández (footballer, born 2004), Chilean footballer

Other sportspeople
 Luis Hernández (athlete) (born 1955), Mexican long-distance runner
 Luis Hernández (boxer) (born 1973), Ecuadorian boxer
 Luis Hernández (baseball) (born 1984), Venezuelan baseball player
 Luis Hernández (figure skater) (born 1985), Mexican figure skater
 Luis Hernández (fencer), Mexican Olympic fencer
 Luis Omar Hernández (born 1985), Mexican professional footballer

Other people
 Luis Almarcha Hernández (1887–1974), Spanish cleric and politician
 Luis Hernandez, member of the Norteno band Los Tigres del Norte